The British Rail Class 175 is a type of diesel multiple-unit (DMU) passenger train from the Alstom Coradia 1000 family, currently operated by Transport for Wales Rail in the United Kingdom.

The fleet of 27 sets was ordered from the French train manufacturer Alstom during July 1997 and were constructed between 1999 and 2001 at Washwood Heath, Birmingham. Driver training and extensive testing of the new fleet was performed at the Old Dalby Test Track from November 1999. The first Class 175 entered revenue service with the train operating company First North Western on 20 June 2000. Ownership of the fleet is held by Angel Trains, who has leased the fleet to various train operators. 

The first operator of the Class 175, North Western Trains (later known as First North Western), did not operate the fleet for long before Wales & Borders was created and inherited it. During December 2003, the new franchisee Arriva Trains Wales took over the Class 175s, by which point early reliability problems had been mostly resolved. First TransPennine Express also briefly operated several. In February 2018, the entire Class 175 fleet was temporarily withdrawn from service for safety checks. During October 2018, the fleet was transferred to the Transport for Wales Rail Services (KeolisAmey Wales) and then to the government-owned Transport for Wales Rail during 2021.

The Class 175 is scheduled to be replaced with a new-build fleet of Class 197 DMUs by 2023.

History
The specification called for the train to be a redesign of the Alstom Coradia Juniper family, with considerable emphasis placed on ride smoothness. Their introduction would enable the withdrawal of rolling stock dating back four decades by that point already. Manufacturing was undertaken at Alstom's facility in Washwood Heath, Birmingham.

However, the company subsequently decided to reconfigure the order to instead cover 11 two-carriage and 16 three-carriage units, all of which possessed a maximum speed of 100 mph. In conjunction with the procurement of the new fleet, purpose-built facilities were established to service it at Chester TMD. This new depot was capable of refuelling, cleaning, washing, and performing general maintenance works for the whole Class 175 fleet.

The trains underwent low speed testing at the Severn Valley Railway prior to additional testing and driver training being conducted at the Old Dalby Test Track from November 1999. The first Class 175 entered revenue service on 20 June 2000.

Description
The Class 175 is a long distance diesel multiple-unit (DMU) that was built in either two-carriage or three-carriage configurations. The two-carriage units are numbered 175001–175011, while the three-carriage units 175101–175116. The individual carriages are labelled as coaches A–B–C, with the two-car units lacking a coach B. The interiors were built to a bespoke design specified by the initial operator, North Western Trains.

Various amenities are incorporated into the train. A relatively novel feature at the time was the presence of airline-style at-seat entertainment systems at some seats that enabled passengers with headphones to listen to radio and recorded audio tracks. Various noise-dampening measures were incorporated, such as a floating floor, acoustic ceiling panels, and high levels of insulation, to produce a relatively quiet interior; a low-noise air conditioning system was also fitted. The Class 175 is furnished with a passenger information system, consisting of onboard LED display and audio announcements that communicate both the destinations and arrivals. Each Class 175 has provisions to accommodate two disabled passengers in coach A, as well as for the storage for two bicycles in coach C.

The exterior of the Class 175 has been designed for improved aerodynamics over preceding rolling stock; it is equipped with a skirted underside and has been shaped to minimise exterior noise. Its launch operator stated that the train possessed both reduced drag and improved fuel efficiency over its existing rolling stock. The suspension system involved a dual air-and-spring arrangement that has been claimed to provide a smoother ride than the British Rail Class 465.

Operations

The Class 175 fleet was initially operated by First North Western (FNW), which placed them on routes serving Birmingham New Street, Crewe and Manchester to Llandudno, Holyhead, Barrow and Windermere. The type quickly displaced the elderly rolling stock that had been used on these routes, such as locomotive-hauled rakes of British Railways Mark 1 carriages. 

Early operations of the Class 175 were troubled by low unit availability on account of reliability problems; several services were substituted for by older locomotive-hauled trains at short notice. To address these issues, the fleet was subject to remedial work, which was largely centred around improvements to the performance of the brakes and bogies. These changes were reportedly successful, having resulted in the reliability of the trains improving substantially.

As part of a restructure of franchise areas, during October 2003, FNW's services on the North Wales Coast Line from Birmingham and Manchester to Llandudno and Holyhead were transferred to the Wales & Borders franchise. All 27 Class 175s were transferred to Wales & Borders, who then sublet 11 to FNW. This arrangement was maintained following FNW's Manchester to Barrow and Windermere services being transferred to First TransPennine Express (FTPE) in February 2004. After FTPE took delivery of faster Class 185 DMUs, this arrangement ceased during December 2006.

During December 2003, all of the Class 175s were transferred along with the Wales & Borders franchise to the new franchisee Arriva Trains Wales. Their sphere of operations was promptly extended to South Wales via the Welsh Marches Line, serving destinations such as Cardiff, Swansea, Pembroke Dock, Fishguard and Milford Haven. In October 2018, the fleet passed with the franchise to Transport for Wales Services; earlier that same year, the operator had announced its plans to replace the Class 175 with new-build Class 197 DMUs by 2023.

In 2019, a comprehensive refurbishment of the Class 175 fleet commenced. Performed at Alstom's Widnes facility, this work saw various improved amenities being installed for passengers, such as re-covered seats, the addition of at-seat USB and electrical sockets, new carpets throughout, and various other new interior fittings; a new external livery was also applied. Refurbishment of the last unit was reportedly completed in January 2022. During February 2021, operation of the Class 175s was transferred along with the franchise to the Welsh Government-owned operator Transport for Wales Rail.

Units 175002 and 175005 were placed in storage in February 2023.

Accidents and incidents
The front seat passenger in one of the cars was fatally injured, although there were no casualties on the train. The train did not derail. The signaller had raised the barriers in error when the train was approaching the crossing, and he was arrested on suspicion of manslaughter in July 2010.

The same service collided with a trailer on the Morfa Main level crossing near Kidwelly on 31 January 2011. The farmer in charge of the trailer was sentenced to a 36-week suspended jail sentence and was ordered to carry out 200hours of community work.

On 19 December 2011, unit 175002 collided with a lorry at the Llanboidy level crossing near Whitland. The train was operating the service from Milford Haven to Manchester Piccadilly and the driver of the lorry was arrested on suspicion of endangering safety.

During February 2018, the entire Class 175 fleet was temporarily withdrawn from service for safety checks. After further investigation, it was found that a track fault between Newport and Cwmbran had caused wheel damage to several trains, not only Class 175s but also some Class 158s.

All three fires were attributed to a build-up of "debris, leaf litter, and other contaminants" in the units' under-floor engine bays, a pre-existing problem for which a remediation programme was already underway at Chester Traincare Centre. Acknowledging that the three incidents in quick succession would "raise concerns", TfW Rail decided on 2 March to temporarily withdraw from service all Class 175 units that had not been through the cleaning the programme. This caused disruption to TfW operations, though the level of disruption reduced in the following days as cleaned units returned to service.

Fleet details

Named units
Some of the class have received names:
 175003 - Eisteddfod Genedlaethol Cymru
 175004 - Mencap - Pengwern College
 175006 - Brondyffryn Trust
 175008 - Valhalla Blackpool Pleasure Beach
 175103 - Mum
 175105 - Bruce
 175107 - Coronation Street Rovers Return
 175111 - Brief Encounter
 175112 - South Lakes Wild Animal Park - Sumatran Tiger
 175114 - Manchester 2002 - Commonwealth Cruiser
 175116 - Peter V. L. Jones, Community Rail Officer Conwy Valley Line

All except for Eisteddfod Genedlaethol Cymru were named by First North Western. The nameplates were all removed in 2009 when the fleet was repainted into Arriva Trains Wales livery.

Notes

References

Sources

External links

 Testing the Class 175s

175
Alstom Coradia
Train-related introductions in 2000